Maggie Voisin (born December 14, 1998,  in Whitefish, Montana) is an American freeskier. She was selected for the U.S. Olympic team to compete in the women's slopestyle event at the 2014 Winter Olympics. Unfortunately, she fractured her right fibula above her ankle and was unable to compete.
During the 2013–14 FIS Freestyle Skiing World Cup season, Voisin finished fourth in events in both Cardona, New Zealand and Copper Mountain in Colorado. At the 2014 Winter X Games, Voisin won the slopestyle silver medal, becoming the youngest skier to medal in X Games history.

Having turned 15 less than two months before the opening of the Sochi Olympics, Voisin would have been the youngest American to compete at the Winter Olympics since 1972.

During the summer, Voisin can be found at Mt. Hood, Oregon, where she hosts a Takeover Session at Windells Camp.

Notes

External links
 
 
 
 
 
 US Freesking profile for Maggie Voisin 

1998 births
Living people
American female freestyle skiers
Olympic freestyle skiers of the United States
Freestyle skiers at the 2018 Winter Olympics
Freestyle skiers at the 2022 Winter Olympics
X Games athletes
People from Whitefish, Montana
Sportspeople from Montana
21st-century American women